Sumeru Parbat is a  high mountain in the Gangotri Glacier region of Garhwal Himalaya, Uttarakhand, India. The mountain is encircled by Kedarnath and Kedardome in the north, Kharchakund in the west & Mandani and Yanbuk in the south.

Climbing History
The first ascent was made in 1971 on the North face by an Indian expedition. The second ascent (first via NE face) was completed in 1984 by a team from Siliguri under the leadership of Durjoy Ghosh, which put four climbers and two Sherpas on the top in inclement weather conditions. A British team attempted an ascent of the south ridge in 1989, but turned back  from the summit due to weather.

References

Mountains of Uttarakhand